Acropserotarache is considered by Butterflies and Moths of the World to be a genus of moths of the family Noctuidae erected by Emilio Berio in 1937. It is considered to be a synonym of Acontia Ochsenheimer, 1816 by The Global Lepidoptera Names Index. Lepidoptera and Some Other Life Forms gives the name as a synonym of Emmelia Hübner, [1821].

References

Acontiinae
Noctuoidea genera